Ileana Dobrovschin (born 19 November 1959) is a Romanian volleyball player. She competed in the women's tournament at the 1980 Summer Olympics.

References

1959 births
Living people
Romanian women's volleyball players
Olympic volleyball players of Romania
Volleyball players at the 1980 Summer Olympics
Sportspeople from Satu Mare